Christian P. Coronel (born March 3, 1980) is a Filipino former professional basketball player. He last played for the Barako Energy Coffee Masters in the Philippine Basketball Association. He also played for the Sta. Lucia Realtors in the Philippine Basketball Association and the Philippine Patriots in the ASEAN Basketball League.

Professional career
Coronel was not drafted in the 2007 PBA draft, making him an unrestricted free agent, but was later signed by the Sta. Lucia Realtors in the 2007–08 PBA season. He became the head coach of College of San Benildo-Rizal in Antipolo at present.

External links
Player Profile
PBA-Online! Profile

1980 births
Living people
San Sebastian Stags basketball players
Philippine Patriots players
Philippines men's national basketball team players
Filipino men's basketball players
Basketball players from Manila
Point guards
Sta. Lucia Realtors players
Barako Bull Energy Boosters players